The North Carolina General Assembly of 1835 met in Raleigh from November 16, 1835 to December 22, 1835. The assembly consisted of the 137 members of the North Carolina House of Commons and 65 senators of North Carolina Senate elected by the voters in August 1835. This was the last assembly elected before the amendments to the Constitution of North Carolina from the North Carolina Constitutional Convention of 1835 took effect. Thus, the House of Commons included representatives from towns (also called Districts) and the number of members of the house was greater than 120.  William H. Haywood, Jr was elected speaker of the House of Commons and Charles Manley was elected clerk.   William D. Mosely was elected President of the Senate and William J. Cowan was elected Clerk.  Richard Dobbs Spaight, Jr. was elected the Governor by the assembly and served from December 10, 1835 to December 31, 1836.  He was the last governor of North Carolina to be elected by the General Assembly.

Councilors of State
The General Assembly elected the following individuals to the Council of State on December 4, 1835:
 Allen Rogers, Wake County (elected President of the Council)
 Thomas B. Haywood (elected Secretary of the Council)
 William Shepperd Ashe, New Hanover County
 Peter H. Dillard, Rockingham County
 Louis D. Henry, Cumberland County
 Henry Skinner, Perquimans County
 Daniel Turner, Warren County
 George Williamson, Caswell County
William Hill continued to serve as the North Carolina Secretary of State  Samuel F. Patterson was elected by the assembly to serve as North Carolina State Treasurer in 1835.  John Reeves Jones Daniel was elected to serve as North Carolina Attorney General.

Membership of the assembly

House of Commons members

There were  137 delegates in the House of Commons, two from each of the 65 counties and one from each of the seven towns/Districts.  They elected William H. Haywood, Jr. from Wake County as their Speaker and Charles Manly from Wake County as their Clerk.

Senate members

There were 65 Senators in the Senate, one from each of the 65 counties in North Carolina.

Acts passed by the assembly
The following acts were passed by this General Assembly:
Implementation of the new election procedures enacted in the constitution convention, including duties of the sheriffs
Suppression of the vice of gambling in the state
Disposition of un-surveyed Cherokee lands in Haywood and Macon Counties
Various acts dealing with Banks, the poor, hawking and peddling, county registers, and veteran seamen
Completion of the construction of the state capital
Chartering of railroad companies in the state
Regulation of slavery
Regulation of the state militia
Incorporation of schools

See also
 List of North Carolina state legislatures

Notes

References

1835
General Assembly
 1835
 1835
1835 U.S. legislative sessions